Matúš Čonka (born 15 October 1990) is a Slovak footballer who plays for ViOn Zlaté Moravce, in the Fortuna Liga as a left back.

Club career
Čonka, product of Lokomotíva Košice youth squads, made his league debut for MFK Košice against Banská Bystrica on 18 July 2009 at the age of 18. He scored his first goal in a 1–1 draw against Žilina on 17 July 2011. In January 2012, he joined Czech club Slavia Prague.

He was transferred to Spartak Trnava in June 2014. He made his league debut for them on 13 July 2014 against Zlaté Moravce.

International career
Čonka was called up for two unofficial friendly fixtures held in Abu Dhabi, UAE, in January 2017, against Uganda (1–3 loss) and Sweden, by his former coach Ján Kozák, who coached for approximately 1 year, while Čonka played for Košice. Čonka made his debut against Sweden, playing the full length of the match, which Slovakia lost 0–6.

Honours 
Spartak Trnava
 Fortuna Liga: 2017–18
 Slovnaft Cup: 2018–19

References

External links

MFK Košice profile

1990 births
Living people
Sportspeople from Košice
Association football fullbacks
Slovak footballers
Slovak expatriate footballers
Slovakia youth international footballers
Slovakia under-21 international footballers
FC VSS Košice players
SK Slavia Prague players
MFK Karviná players
FC Spartak Trnava players
FC ViOn Zlaté Moravce players
Slovak Super Liga players
Czech First League players
Slovak expatriate sportspeople in the Czech Republic
Expatriate footballers in the Czech Republic